Terry Wayne Hughes (born May 13, 1949 in Boiling Springs, South Carolina) is a former Major League Baseball third baseman. Listed at 6'1", 185 lb., Hughes batted and threw right-handed.

Hughes attended Paul M. Dorman High School, and was a heavily scouted prospect in both basketball and baseball by the end of his freshman season. The Chicago Cubs selected him second overall in the 1967 Major League Baseball Draft.

He spent most of the season with the triple A Tulsa Oilers, however, appeared in eleven games with the Cards, in which he batted .214 with an RBI and a run scored.

Following his only season in the Cardinals organization, he was traded with Reggie Cleveland and Diego Segui to the Boston Red Sox for Lynn McGlothen, John Curtis and Mike Garman. He appeared in 41 games for the Red Sox, mostly as a late inning replacement for Rico Petrocelli, and batted .203 with six runs batted in, including his only major league home run off the Cleveland Indians' Milt Wilcox.

In a three-season career, Hughes hit .209 (18-for-86) with one home run and seven RBI in 54 games, including six runs and three doubles.
He is now a Physical Education coach at Boiling Springs Rainbow Lake Middle School.

References

External links

Terry Hughes at Baseball Almanac
Sports Illustrated

1949 births
Living people
Boston Red Sox players
Chicago Cubs players
St. Louis Cardinals players
Major League Baseball third basemen
Baseball players from South Carolina
Caldwell Cubs players
San Antonio Missions players
Greenville Red Sox players
Quincy Cubs players
Tacoma Cubs players
Wichita Aeros players
Tulsa Oilers (baseball) players
Pawtucket Red Sox players
People from Boiling Springs, South Carolina